Danville or Dansville may refer to:

Canada
Danville, Quebec

United States
Danville, Alabama
Danville, Arkansas
Danville, California
Danville, Georgia
Danville, Illinois
Danville, Indiana
Danville, Iowa
Danville, Kansas
Danville, Kentucky
Danville, Allegany County, Maryland
Danville, Prince George's County, Maryland
Dansville, Michigan
Danville, Mississippi
Danville, Missouri
Danville, New Hampshire
Dansville, Livingston County, New York, a village in the town of North Dansville
Dansville, Steuben County, New York, a town
Danville, Ohio
Danville, Pennsylvania
Danville, Texas
Danville, Vermont, a New England town
Danville (CDP), Vermont, village in the town
Danville, Virginia
Danville, Washington, home of Danville's Lost Gold Ledge, a lost gold mine
Danville, West Virginia
Danville, Wisconsin

South Africa
Danville, Pretoria, a suburb of Pretoria, Gauteng Province

Television
 Jo Danville (CSI: NY)
Danville, a fictional city in the television series Phineas and Ferb and Milo Murphy's Law

See also
Damville (disambiguation)
Denville